The year 2012 is the 3rd year in the history of Australian Fighting Championship (AFC), a mixed martial arts promotion based in Australia. In 2012 AFC held 2 events.

Events list

AFC 4 

AFC 4 was an event held on December 7, 2012, at Melbourne Pavilion in Melbourne, Australia.

Results

AFC 3 

AFC 3 was an event held on April 14, 2012, at Geelong Arena in Geelong, Australia.

Results

References 

2012 in mixed martial arts
2012 in Australian sport
AFC (mixed martial arts) events